AKM Nazmul Hasan is a Major General in the Bangladesh Army who is incumbent Director General of Boarder Guards Bangladesh (BGB). Prior to Join here, he served as Director General of  Bangladesh Ansar and Village Defence Party. He also served as General officer Commanding (GOC) of 11th Infantry Division & Area Commander, Bogura Area.

Early life and education 
Hasan joined Bangladesh Military Academy with 18th BMA Long course in 15 July 1986 and was commissioned on 24 June 1988. He holds Bachelor of Science (BSc) degree from Chittagong University and Masters on Defence Studies (MDS) degree from the National University. He has also completed Army Staff Course from Defence Services Command and Staff College, Mirpur and National Defence Course from National Defence College of Bangladesh.

Career 
General nazmul join Bangladesh Ansar and VDP on 21 July 2022. He replaced Major General Mizanur Rahman Shamim. He is also the Chairman of Ansar-VDP Unnayan Bank. He served as GOC of Bogura Area for more than 2 years. He also served as Director of Counter Intelligence Bureau at Directorate General of Forces Intelligence Headquarters. Nazmul successfully completed United Nation Peacekeeping Mission in Bosnia Herzegovina as a platoon commander in 1994 at Bihac Pocket and Officer Commanding of Sector Reserve at Nyala, Darfur, Sudan in 2010. On 17th January, 2023 Govt appoint him as the Director General of Boarder Guards Bangladesh (BGB).

References 

Living people
Bangladesh Army generals
Bangladesh Ansar
1969 births
National Defense College alumni
People from Faridpur District
Director Generals of Border Guards Bangladesh